The letters of last resort are four identically-worded handwritten letters from the prime minister of the United Kingdom to the commanding officers of the four British ballistic missile submarines. They contain orders on what action to take if an enemy nuclear strike has destroyed the British government, and has killed or otherwise incapacitated both the prime minister and their designated "second person", typically a high-ranking member of the Cabinet, such as the deputy prime minister or the first secretary of state, to whom the prime minister has designated the responsibility of choosing how to act, if they die in office. If the orders are carried out, the action taken could be the last official act of His Majesty's Government.

If the letters are not used during the term of the prime minister who wrote them, they are destroyed unopened after that person leaves office, so that their content remains unknown to anyone except the issuer.

Process
A new prime minister writes a set of letters immediately after taking office and being told by the chief of the Defence Staff "precisely what damage a Trident missile could cause". The documents are then delivered to the submarines in sealed envelopes, and the previous prime minister's letters are destroyed without being opened.

In the event of the deaths of both the prime minister and the designated alternative decision-maker as a result of a nuclear strike, the commander(s) of any nuclear submarine(s) on patrol at the time would use a series of checks to ascertain whether the letters of last resort must be opened.

According to Peter Hennessy's book The Secret State: Whitehall and the Cold War, 1945 to 1970, the process by which a  commander would determine if the British government continues to function includes, amongst other checks, establishing whether BBC Radio 4 continues broadcasting.

In 1983, the procedure for Polaris submarines was to open the envelopes if there was an evident nuclear attack, or if all UK naval broadcasts had ceased for four hours.

Options
While the contents of these letters are secret, according to the December 2008 BBC Radio 4 documentary The Human Button, there were four known options given to the prime minister to include in the letters. The prime minister might instruct the submarine commander to:

 retaliate with nuclear weapons;
 not retaliate;
 use their own judgement; or,
 place the submarine under an allied country's command, if possible. The documentary mentions Australia and the United States.

The Guardian reported in 2016 that the options are said to include: "Put yourself under the command of the US, if it is still there", "Go to Australia", "Retaliate", or "Use your own judgement". The actual option chosen remains known only to the writer of the letter.

Fiction
David Greig's 2012 play The Letter of Last Resort deals with the consequences and paradoxes of the letters. The play was first staged in February 2012 as a part of a cycle of plays on "The Bomb" at the Tricycle Theatre in London, directed by Nicolas Kent, with Belinda Lang playing the role of the incoming prime minister and Simon Chandler, her advisor. The production was also seen at the Traverse Theatre in Edinburgh, for the Edinburgh Fringe later the same year. The following year it was broadcast on BBC Radio 4, with the same cast, first transmitted on 1 June 2013.

The KGB's attempts to obtain the contents of the letters of last resort are part of the plot of the BBC Cold War spy drama The Game (2014).

See also
 Operation Looking Glass
 Dead Hand
 Samson Option
 Mutual assured destruction
 Nuclear weapons and the United Kingdom § Nuclear weapons control
 Trident nuclear programme
 Fail-deadly
 Dead man's switch

Footnotes

References

External links
 
 
 Radio archive: 

Cabinet Office (United Kingdom)
Emergency management in the United Kingdom
Letters (message)
United Kingdom nuclear command and control
Nuclear strategy
Nuclear secrecy